Seriously Single is a 2007 album by Italian singer JustCarmen that puts a relatively unknown singer into the studio with recordings of big stars from the past. It was produced by Giovanni Di Stefano.

In 2009 he produced and launched a second album by JustCarmen, I wish u love, which has two new duets with The Bachelors.

It included, "Everyone's Gone to the Moon", a track written by Jonathan King. Featured artists included The Bachelors, Elvis Presley, Gloria Estefan and Al Martino.

Track listing
 "I Believe" with Dec & Con of The Bachelors (Ervin Drake, Irvin Graham, Jimmy Shirl, Al Stillman) – 2:05
 "Anema e core" (D'Esposito - Manlio) – 3:26
 "Cercando di te" (Pooh) – 4:28
 "Champagne-in dialetto" (Peppino di Capri) – 3:58
 "Come saprei" (Ramazzotti-Cogliati/Ramazzotti-Tosetto) – 5:02
 "Con Los Anos" (Gloria Estefan) – 3:51
 "E se domani" (Calabrese-Rossi) – 3:23
 "Everyones goes to the Moon" (Jonathan King) – 2:23
 "Halfway to paradise" with Bobby Solo (Carole King and Gerry Goffin) – 2:31
 "I Believe-Rap" with Handle Remin/Con & Dec of The Bachelors (Handle Remix) – 4:05
 "Its Impossible" with Elvis Presley (Wayne-Manzanero) – 2:53
 "Grande Grande Grande" (Tony Renis) – 3:24
 "Historia de un amor" (Pineda) – 4:03
 "Innamorarsi Mai" (Martino) – 3:13
 "Io che amo solo te" (Endrigo) – 3:23
 "Il cielo in una stanza" with Bobby Solo/Alan Reeves/Giovanni Di Stefano (Mogol/Toang [alias Gino Paoli]) – 2:26
 "Strano il mio destino" (Maurizio-Todrani) – 4:17
 "Spanish eyes" with Al Martino (B-Kemfert - C. Singleton - E. Snyder) (IT Lyrics Messi-Di Stefano) – 2:56
 "You don't have to say you love me" with Elvis Presley (Donaggio) – 2:41
 "Nada cambiera mi amor por ti" (Masser-Gofin) – 3:50
 "Those magic changes" with Mr. Boogie Woogie (Jacobs-Casey) – 2:07
 "Fingere di te" with Giovanni Di Stefano (Paoli) – 3:23
 "Georgie girl" with Con & Dec of The Bachelors (Hendricks-Dale) – 3:07
 "Vorrei che fosse amore" (Chiccola) – 2:25

References

External links

2007 albums
Pop albums by Italian artists
Jazz albums by Italian artists
Blues albums by Italian artists